Rogério Dutra Silva was the defending champion, but he lost in the quarterfinals to José Hernández.

Guido Pella won the title, defeating Christian Lindell in the final, 7–5, 7–6(7–1)

Seeds

Draw

Finals

Top half

Bottom half

References
 Main Draw
 Qualifying Draw

Sao Paulo Challenger de Tenis - Singles
Tennis tournaments in Brazil